Vastrapur Lake is situated in western part of Ahmedabad. It is officially named after Narsinh Mehta. The lake was beautified by the AMC after 2002 and has since become a popular spot in the city.

Everyday, many people visit this lake. It currently boasts an open-air theater and children's park. There is a 600m pathway all around the lake which serves many walkers and joggers in the early mornings and in the evenings. There are also few fitness equipments available like chest press, lat pull down, hip rollers, pull bar, rowing machine.

The lush green lawns surrounding this lake also serve as a central hub of Ahmedabad, wherein various cultural events take place regularly.

At times, the water from Narmada River is allowed to flow into this lake. The lake is surrounded by pretty gardens with much stonework.

In 2013, Vastrapur lake was renamed to 'Bhakt Kavi Narsinh Mehta Sarovar' in memory of Narsinh Mehta and a statue of Narsinh Mehta was installed in the garden of lake.

In 2016, the lake almost dried up. People removed dead fish, and moved surviving fish elsewhere.

In September 2019, Amdavad Municipal Corporation is planning fill the lake with Narmada River water.

References

See also 
 Kankaria Lake 
 Chandola Lake
 Thol Lake

Geography of Ahmedabad
Tourist attractions in Ahmedabad
Lakes of Gujarat